Scherz is a former municipality in the district of Brugg in canton of Aargau in Switzerland. On 1 January 2018 the former municipality of Scherz merged into the municipality of Lupfig.

Geography

Of this area,  or 55.2% is used for agricultural purposes, while  or 33.3% is forested. Of the rest of the land,  or 11.8% is settled (buildings or roads),  or 0.6% is either rivers or lakes.

Of the built up area, housing and buildings made up 5.2% and transportation infrastructure made up 5.5%.  33.0% of the total land area is heavily forested.  Of the agricultural land, 41.8% is used for growing crops and 9.4% is pastures, while 3.9% is used for orchards or vine crops.  All the water in the municipality is in rivers and streams.

Coat of arms
The blazon of the municipal coat of arms is Argent a feather Gules between two other Or all issuant from a Heart Gules.  This might be an example of canting, since the heart is part of the name Scherz.

Demographics
Over the last 10 years (1997–2007) the population has changed at a rate of -1.3%. Most of the population speaks German (95.5%), with Albanian being second most common ( 1.7%) and French being third ( 1.6%).

The age distribution, in Scherz is; 76 children or 12.3% of the population are between 0 and 9 years old and 77 teenagers or 12.5% are between 10 and 19.  Of the adult population, 60 people or 9.7% of the population are between 20 and 29 years old.  77 people or 12.5% are between 30 and 39, 121 people or 19.6% are between 40 and 49, and 84 people or 13.6% are between 50 and 59.  The senior population distribution is 73 people or 11.8% of the population are between 60 and 69 years old, 40 people or 6.5% are between 70 and 79, there are 8 people or 1.3% who are between 80 and 89,and there is 1 person who is between 90 and older.

, there were 10 homes with 1 or 2 persons in the household, 86 homes with 3 or 4 persons in the household, and 117 homes with 5 or more persons in the household.  The average number of people per household was 2.52 individuals.   there were 120 single family homes (or 48.6% of the total) out of a total of 247 homes and apartments. There were a total of 4 empty apartments for a 1.6% vacancy rate.  , the construction rate of new housing units was 1.7 new units per 1000 residents.

In the 2007 federal election the most popular party was the SVP which received 48.6% of the vote.  The next three most popular parties were the SP (21.4%), the Green Party (8.7%) and the CSP (7.8%).

In Scherz about 86.9% of the population (between age 25–64) have completed either non-mandatory upper secondary education or additional higher education (either university or a Fachhochschule). Of the school age population, there are 67 students attending primary school in the municipality.

The historical population is given in the following table:

Economy
, Scherz had an unemployment rate of 1.89%.  , there were 37 people employed in the primary economic sector and about 15 businesses involved in this sector.  16 people are employed in the secondary sector and there are 6 businesses in this sector.  58 people are employed in the tertiary sector, with 17 businesses in this sector.

 there was a total of 303 workers who lived in the municipality.  Of these, 242 or about 79.9% of the residents worked outside Scherz while 28 people commuted into the municipality for work.  There were a total of 89 jobs (of at least 6 hours per week) in the municipality. Of the working population, 12.3% used public transportation to get to work, and 57.4% used a private car.

Religion

References

Former municipalities of Aargau